Adur-Anahid was a high-ranking 3rd-century Iranian noblewoman from the royal Sasanian family, who wielded the title of Queen of Queens (banbishnan banbishn). She was a daughter of the second Sasanian King of Kings of Iran, Shapur I.

Name 
Her name is most likely a combination of adur ("fire") and the name of the Iranian goddess, Anahita. Originally thought to mean "Fire of Anahita", her name is now agreed to mean "Fire and Anahita".

Biography 

In the first paragraph, Shapur I claims to have ordered the establishment of fires for his daughter Adur-Anahid and three of his sons, Hormizd, Shapur, and Narseh. The fire established for Adur-Anahid was named Husraw-Adur-Anahid. In the second paragraph, Shapur I claims to have rewarded Adur-Anahid, along with princes and other high-ranking members of the court by ordering sacrifices in their names. Adur-Anahid is mentioned with the title of Queen of Queens (banbishnan banbishn) in the inscription.

The German Iranologist Walther Hinz has suggested that Adur-Anahid was the spouse of her father Shapur I, demonstrating the practice in Zoroastrianism of khwedodah, or close-kin marriage. However, this is opposed by other scholars, who have deduced that the title of members of the royal family illustrated their social status rather than family status. The title of "Queen" was wielded by all women of the royal Sasanian family, including the king's daughters and sisters, and the spouses of Sasanian princes. The title of Adur-Anahid thus demonstrated her status as the highest ranking woman in the court. There is no suggestion that she practiced kwedodah with her father. According to the modern historian Maria Brosius, "Analysis of the written evidence for the Sasanian period does not permit the conclusion that the Sasanian kings favored incestuous marriages."

Notes

References

Sources 
 
 
 
 

 

Sasanian queens
3rd-century Iranian people
Year of death unknown
3rd-century births
3rd-century women